Anoectochilus brevilabris is a species of orchid native to the mountains of Sikkim, Nepal, Assam, India, and Vietnam.

References

brevilabris
Orchids of India
Orchids of Nepal
Orchids of Assam
Orchids of Vietnam
Flora of Sikkim
Plants described in 1840